Marked is the first novel of the House of Night fantasy series written by P.C. Cast and Kristin Cast.

Young teenagers are selected to enter a four-year period transformation to a vampyre and marked with the unfilled mark of a crescent moon. Those are sent to their local Houses of Night, private schools directed by vampyres, specialized in helping the adolescents, called fledglings, survive the Change.

Young fledgling Zoey is unusual: unlike other normal fledglings, she bears a filled mark, a sign that the goddess of vampyres, Nyx, has bestowed a great destiny onto her, but she also has to deal with normal high school girl issues, like school, boyfriends and the evil popular girl waiting just around the corner.

The book has been translated into more than 20 languages including French, Spanish, German and Chinese.

Plot 
Sixteen-year-old Zoey Redbird lives in a world where vampires, or "vampyres" have always existed. One day, during school, Zoey is marked by a Tracker to become a fledgling vampyre at the Tulsa House of Night, a boarding school where she will be trained to become an adult vampyre. She gets stopped outside in the parking lot by her boyfriend Heath, and his friends who call her a freak and drive away. Zoey then hurries home to tell her mom. Her mother, Linda Heffer, blames her for the Mark and, together with her ultra-religious husband (Zoey's stepfather/step-loser), she tries to keep Zoey at home, to be presented to the Elders of the People of Faith, an anti-vampyre group. As fledglings need to be constantly in the presence of an adult vampyre so that their bodies won't reject the Change, Zoey flees to her grandmother Sylvia, a Cherokee Wise Woman. On the way, she passes out and has a vision with the vampyre goddess, Nyx, who announces to Zoey that she will be her "eyes and ears" at the House of Night. The goddess leaves Zoey with the words "Darkness does not always equate to evil, Light does not always bring good" which becomes a very frequent and important message throughout the series.

Zoey wakes up at the school in the presence of her grandmother and the vampyre headmaster – her future mentor, Neferet. She finds out that her Mark is all filled in, unusually for fledglings, but follows her intuition and doesn't mention the vision to Neferet. As a fledgling vampyre, Zoey has the opportunity to change her name and does so, taking her grandmother's surname, Redbird, before parting with her. Aphrodite, another fledgling then takes her to her room, where she meets Stevie Rae, her new roommate and, future best friend.

Through Stevie Rae, Zoey meets and befriends Damien, Erin, and Shaunee. She also meets the snobby, beautiful leader of the Dark Daughters and Sons, Aphrodite, a fledgling with the power to see the future. To humiliate Zoey she invites her to join the Dark Daughters, who are an elitist group. Her new friends counsel her to accept so that they can get insight into Aphrodite's doing's. During the ritual, Aphrodite feeds her fledgling blood and Zoey discovers a new craving, unusual for her age. Embarrassed, she flees – but finds Heath, her ex-boyfriend, and Kayla, her best friend, who have come to the school in an attempt to bust Zoey out. Zoey stumbles upon them while Kayla is hitting on Heath. An angry confrontation ensues with her now ex-best friend and Zoey loses control. She scratches Heath and drinks from the wound, creating an Imprint with him. Kayla freaks out and runs away; Zoey eventually persuades Heath to leave too. When they have gone, Zoey discovers that Erik Night, a handsome fifth former and Dark Son whom she met earlier, has seen the whole scene. He comforts her and escorts her back to the dorm. That night she is chosen by a cat, whom she names Nala.

The following day, she meets Neferet, who explains to her that an Imprint is a link that takes place between an adult vampyre and his or her human Consort. As it is very unusual that Zoey could create an Imprint in her first month of being a "vampyre", she places Zoey into a senior vampyre sociology course. Zoey discovers that she has affinities for the five elements of air, fire, earth, water, and spirit – something that has never happened before in vampyre history. Stevie Rae, Damien, Shaunee, and Erin each gain an affinity for one element as well.

Zoey is (spitefully) invited back to the Dark Daughters and Sons' Samhain celebration, where they honor the spirits with some blood. Everything goes fine until sobered up Heath stumbles upon the scene and tries to bring Zoey back with him. Aphrodite accidentally summons evil spirits which try to take Heath's fresh human blood. Zoey steps in; she and her friends use their newfound abilities to stop the spirits. Neferet, who happens to witness everything, takes Aphrodite's status as leader of the Dark Daughters and Sons and gives it to Zoey instead. As they go home, Aphrodite angrily informs Zoey that "it's not over yet – you don't understand."

Characters

Zoey Redbird
Nyx
Erik Night
Stevie Rae
Neferet
Heath Luck
Aphrodite LaFont
Sylvia Redbird
Erin Bates
Shaunee Cole
Damien Maslin
Linda Heffer

Reception
In its best week the book ranked 16th in the New York Times, USA Today Top 150 Bestseller List, where it remained an additional 89 weeks. Furthermore, it won a Romantic Times Reviewers' Choice Young Adult Novel Award in 2009.
"The Casts, mother and daughter, have written a delightful book that's aimed at teens but will be enjoyed by readers of all ages. The trials of growing up are presented in the new and original context of a vampire society, and they're woven into a thoroughly entertaining story. Zoey is a dynamic and spunky heroine who has an amusing and realistic voice. She's surrounded by secondary characters who are just as engaging. The dialogue is sharp and the references to real people and pop culture add to the story. This promises to be a highly addictive series."(Romantic Times)
"From the moment I stuck my face in this book it hooked me!  Totally awesome new take on vampires!  Marked is hot and dark and funny.  It rocks!" (Gena Showalter)

References

External links
Marked on the series' official website
Marked on the publisher's website

2007 American novels
American young adult novels
American fantasy novels
American horror novels
American romance novels
American vampire novels
House of Night series